Ljutice may refer to:

 Ljutice, Koceljeva, a village in the Koceljeva municipality of the Mačva District, Serbia
 Ljutice, Požega, a village in Požega, Serbia, Zlatibor District, Serbia

See also
 Ljutic (disambiguation)